Rushnavand (also Romanized as Rūshnāvand, Rowshanāvand, Rowshnāvand, and Rushnāwand; also known as Rowsanāvand and Rūshanābād) is a village in Pas Kalut Rural District, in the Central District of Gonabad County, Razavi Khorasan Province, Iran. At the 2006 census, its population was 2,770, in 675 families.

References 

Populated places in Gonabad County